St. John the Evangelist is the Anglican parish church of Pembroke in Bermuda. It was established in the 1620s when it was known as Spanish Point Church, the original name for Pembroke Parish. The original church was a wooden structure with a thatched roof of palmetto leaves. It was destroyed by fire after a hurricane and rebuilt in 1721 and again in 1821.

The St John's churchyard is known as Pembroke Churchyard or Pembroke Cemetery.

Notable interments
Bishop Edward Feild (1876)
Robert Laffan, governor of Bermuda. (1882)

See also
 Pembroke Wesleyan Cemetery nearby

References

External links 

Cemeteries in Bermuda
1621 establishments in North America
Anglican church buildings in Bermuda
Pembroke Parish